Maria Cocchetti (born 19 June 1966) is an Italian female mountain runner, silver medal at the 1990 World Mountain Running Championships.

Biography
At individual senior level she won 6 medals (1 silver individual in 1990 and 5 with the national team) at the World Mountain Running Championships.

Team results
World Mountain Running Championships (5 medals)
 1987, 1989 (2)
 1988, 1990 (2)
 1991 (1)

National titles
Italian Mountain Running Championships
 1987, 1988, 1990 (3)

References

External links
 

1966 births
Living people
Italian female mountain runners
Italian female long-distance runners
Italian female marathon runners
Sportspeople from Bergamo